Pelin Derya Bilgiç (born 15 July 1994) is a Turkish basketball player for Galatasaray and the Turkish national team.

Club career
On 18 May 2021, she signed a new one-year contract with Galatasaray.

National team career
She participated at the EuroBasket Women 2017.

References

External links
 Pelin Bilgiç at Tbf.org

1994 births
Living people
Turkish women's basketball players
Sportspeople from Mersin
Point guards
Galatasaray S.K. (women's basketball) players
Fenerbahçe women's basketball players
Botaş SK players
21st-century Turkish women